Cédric Plançon (born April 20, 1969 in Lille, Nord) is a retired male weightlifter from France. He competed in two consecutive Summer Olympics for his native country, starting in 1992 (Barcelona, Spain). His best finish was the 9th place in the men's middle-heavyweight division (1992).

References 

1969 births
French male weightlifters
Living people
Olympic weightlifters of France
Weightlifters at the 1992 Summer Olympics
Weightlifters at the 1996 Summer Olympics
20th-century French people